Kjellaug Pettersen (born 5 January 1934 at Andøya, died 11 November 2012) was a Norwegian senior government official, politician and feminist.

She worked as a teacher and headmistress of Bygdøy School from 1979 to 1988. In 1981 she was appointed by the Ministry of Education as a member of an expert committee on gender equality, and in 1991 she became director of the gender equality secretariat within the Ministry of Education. She later served as a special adviser in the Ministry of Education.

She was a co-founder of the Women's University in 1983 and was president of the Norwegian Association for Women's Rights from 1994 to 1998. She was a deputy member of the Ministry of Foreign Affairs' committee on human rights from 1994 to 1995.

Publications
 Framtidsdrømmen og virkeligheten : jenter og gutter velger utdanning og yrke, Friundervisningens forlag, 1990, 
 Tøffe gutter, stille jenter; hjemme og på skolen, Aventura, 1987,

References

Norwegian women's rights activists
1934 births
2012 deaths
Norwegian civil servants
Norwegian feminists
Heads of schools in Norway
20th-century Norwegian politicians
20th-century Norwegian women politicians
Norwegian Association for Women's Rights people